The Woman with Flowers is a 2012 collection of novellas by Nobel prize-winning author Mo Yan.

References 

Works by Mo Yan
2012 short story collections
Chinese novellas